Pimpin' on Wax is the debut solo studio album by American rapper JT Money. It was released on May 25, 1999, through Priority Records. Production was handled by Kevin "She'kspere" Briggs, Christoper "Tricky" Stewart, Dallas Austin and JT Money himself. It features guest appearances from Anthony Hamilton, Big Gipp, Evil, Solé, Too Short and Trick Daddy.

The album peaked at No. 28 on the Billboard 200 and No. 8 on the Top R&B/Hip-Hop Albums. The single "Who Dat" featuring rapper Solé made it to number 5 on the Billboard Hot 100, number 2 on the Hot R&B/Hip-Hop Singles & Tracks and number 1 on the Hot Rap Tracks. "Who Dat" was certified gold by the Recording Industry Association of America on September 30, 1999.

Track listing

Personnel

 Jeffrey "JT Money" Thompkins – main artist, producer (track 7)
 Tonya "Solé" Johnston – featured artist (track 3)
 Anthony Hamilton – featured artist (track 4)
 Evil – featured artist (track 7)
 Cameron Gipp – featured artist (track 8)
 Todd "Too $hort" Shaw – featured artist (track 10)
 Maurice "Trick Daddy" Young – featured artist (track 12)
 The Red Zone Clique – backing vocals (track 3)
 G-Boy – backing vocals (track 4)
 Kevin "She'kspere" Briggs – producer (tracks: 1, 5, 6, 8-10, 13), recording (tracks: 6, 8, 10, 13)
 Christoper "Tricky" Stewart – producer & recording (tracks: 2, 3, 14)
 Dallas Austin – producer (tracks: 4, 11, 12), executive producer, art direction, A&R
 Shawn Grove – recording (tracks: 1, 5, 9)
 Kevin Davis – mixing (tracks: 1, 2, 5, 6, 9, 10, 13, 14)
 Leslie Brathwaite – mixing (tracks: 3, 8), recording (track 4)
 Ricciano "Ricco" Lumpkins – recording (track 4), mixing (tracks: 4, 11, 12)
 Carlton Lynn – recording (tracks: 4, 11, 12)
 Alvin Speights – mixing (track 6)
 Brian Hood – recording (track 7)
 Ray Seay – mixing (track 7)
 Brian "Big Bass" Gardner – mastering
 Tony Mercedes – executive producer, A&R
 Colin Jahn – art direction
 David Gates – art direction
 Ernest Washington – photography
 Colin Wolfe – bass
 Tomi Martin – guitar
 Mark "Exit" Goodchild – mixing assistant, recording
 Stuart Gordon – mixing, recording
 John Horesco – assistant engineer, mixing assistant, recording
 Ty Hudson – assistant engineer
 Danny Kresco – mixing assistant
 Andrew Lyn – assistant engineer, recording
 Vernon J. Mungo – mixing assistant
 Jason Piske – mixing assistant
 Claudine Pontier – mixing assistant
 Rick Sheppard – midi, sound design

Charts

Weekly charts

Year-end charts

References

External links

JT Money albums
1999 debut albums
Priority Records albums
Albums produced by Dallas Austin
Albums produced by Tricky Stewart